Jürgen Kohler (born 6 October 1965) is a World Cup-winning German footballer and manager, who played as a centre-back. Since 2018, he has been in charge of the youth team of Viktoria Köln.

Playing career
Kohler enjoyed a lengthy career at the highest level with exactly 500 top flight league matches, playing primarily as a centre back in the German Bundesliga, and in the Italian Serie A, achieving notable success both at domestic and international level with FC Bayern Munich, Borussia Dortmund and Juventus.

Kohler's professional career began at Waldhof Mannheim, where he made his Bundesliga debut as a substitute against 1. FC Kaiserslautern in April 1984. His first professional goal came in a 5–2 defeat of FC Schalke 04 on 26 January 1985.

A two-year spell at 1. FC Köln preceded a transfer to Bayern Munich, with the Bavarian club winning the Bundesliga championship in his first season at the club.

In 1991, Kohler transferred to Italian club Juventus. After being named Serie A's best foreign player for 1992, he went on to be part of the team that won the 1992–93 UEFA Cup against Borussia Dortmund, as well as a league and cup double in the 1994–95 season.

Returning to Germany to play for Dortmund in 1995, Kohler won another league championship in 1996 and helped the club to the 1997 UEFA Champions League Final. In a reversal of Kohler's previous continental final, Dortmund defeated his former club Juventus to become European Champions for the first time. As a result of this success, Kohler was named Footballer of the Year (Germany) for 1997. In the 2001–02 season, the last of his career, Kohler won his third Bundesliga title with Dortmund and reached the final of the UEFA Cup.

In his final professional appearance, the 2002 UEFA Cup Final against Feyenoord, Kohler was sent off for a foul on Jon Dahl Tomasson in the 31st minute of the match. After losing possession to Tomasson on the edge of Dortmund's penalty area, Kohler tripped the Danish forward inside the area to concede a penalty kick and was given a straight red card by referee Vítor Melo Pereira. Pierre van Hooijdonk scored the opening goal from the resulting penalty and BVB went on to lose the match 3–2.

At international level, Kohler made over 100 appearances for the German national team, playing at three FIFA World Cups and three UEFA European Championships, winning the 1990 FIFA World Cup and UEFA Euro 1996.

Style of play
Regarded as one of the best defenders of his generation, Kohler was a complete and physically strong centre-back, who was famed for his defensive perception, anticipation, quick reactions, and marking, as well as his tactical sense; he was also known for his prowess in the air, courtesy of his height, timing, heading accuracy, and elevation, which also made him a goal threat during set-pieces. Although primarily a hard-tackling but fair stopper, he was also known for his composure and finesse when in possession, and his ability to play the ball out of defence, which he was able to improve as his career progressed, in particular during his time in Italy, where he showed significant technical developments. Beyond his defensive capabilities, he also stood out for his mentality, professionalism, and leadership qualities. Despite his ability as a defender, however, he also struggled with injuries throughout his career; his physical struggles occasionally limited his playing time and affected his form and consistency. Moreover, he was predominantly a right-footed player, who was not particularly adept with his weaker left foot.

Coaching career
After his playing career was over, he has managed the German under-21 side, and became sports director of Bayer Leverkusen on 31 March 2003, quitting this post on 29 June 2004.

On 17 December 2005, he was appointed the coach of MSV Duisburg.

In August 2006, he turned down the opportunity to coach the Ivory Coast national team.

On 28 August 2008, Kohler signed a three-year contract as manager of German 3. Liga club VfR Aalen. However, on 16 November 2008, he retired due to a heart condition from the coaching job. He continued to work as director of sports for Aalen, but was sacked on 5 May 2009.

In April 2013, he started to work as director of sports for his former club SV Waldhof Mannheim.

Personal life
After his retirement from professional sports, Kohler occasionally played for Alemannia Adendorf in the Kreisliga C (the 11th tier of German club football).

Career statistics

Club

1 Including appearances in 1989 DFB-Supercup,1990 DFB-Supercup,1995 DFB-Supercup,1996 DFB-Supercup and 1997 UEFA Super Cup .

International

Scores and results list Germany's goal tally first, score column indicates score after each Kohler goal.

Honours
Bayern Munich
 Bundesliga: 1989–90
 DFL-Supercup: 1990

Juventus
 Serie A: 1994–95
 Coppa Italia: 1994–95
 UEFA Cup: 1992–93

Borussia Dortmund
 Bundesliga: 1995–96, 2001–02
 DFL-Supercup: 1995, 1996
 UEFA Champions League: 1996–97
 Intercontinental Cup: 1997

Germany
 FIFA World Cup: 1990
 UEFA European Championship: 1996, runner-up 1992

Individual
 kicker Bundesliga Team of the Season: 1986–87, 1987–88, 1988–89, 1990–91, 1998–99, 2000–01
 UEFA European Championship Team of the Tournament: 1992
 Footballer of the Year in Germany: 1997

See also
 List of men's footballers with 100 or more international caps

References

External links

1965 births
Living people
1990 FIFA World Cup players
1994 FIFA World Cup players
1998 FIFA World Cup players
FC Bayern Munich footballers
Borussia Dortmund players
FIFA World Cup-winning players
German expatriate footballers
German footballers
German football managers
Germany international footballers
Germany under-21 international footballers
FIFA Century Club
Bundesliga players
Association football defenders
SV Waldhof Mannheim players
1. FC Köln players
Juventus F.C. players
Serie A players
UEFA Euro 1988 players
UEFA Euro 1992 players
UEFA Euro 1996 players
UEFA European Championship-winning players
Expatriate footballers in Italy
German expatriate sportspeople in Italy
MSV Duisburg managers
Bundesliga managers
VfR Aalen managers
3. Liga managers
UEFA Champions League winning players
UEFA Cup winning players
Germany national under-21 football team managers
FC Viktoria Köln managers
Footballers from Rhineland-Palatinate
West German footballers